Arman Galiasqaruly Dunayev (born October 7, 1966) previously served as the Finance Minister in the Government of Kazakhstan. He replaced Yerbolat Dosayev on 5 April 2004.

References

1966 births
Living people
Ministers of Finance (Kazakhstan)
Government ministers of Kazakhstan
Kazakhstani economists